Lessons in Chemistry is an upcoming drama television series based on the novel of the same name by Bonnie Garmus. It is due to debut in 2023 on Apple TV+.

Premise
A female scientist in the 1960s begins using a cooking show she is hired to host to educate housewives on scientific topics after she is fired from her own lab.

Cast
 Brie Larson as Elizabeth Zott
 Lewis Pullman as Calvin Evans
 Aja Naomi King as Harriet Slone
 Stephanie Koenig as Fran Frask
 Patrick Walker as Wakely
 Thomas Mann as Boryweitz
 Kevin Sussman as Walter
 Beau Bridges as Wilson
 Ashley Monique Clark as Martha Wakeley
 Derek Cecil as Dr. Robert Donatti

Production
It was announced in January 2021 that Apple TV+ had issued a straight to series order for the show, with Brie Larson set to star in and executive produce. The series began production by August 2022, with Lewis Pullman, Aja Naomi King, Stephanie Koenig, Patrick Walker, Thomas Mann, Kevin Sussman and Beau Bridges added to the cast.

References

External links

2020s American drama television series

English-language television shows
Upcoming drama television series
Apple TV+ original programming
Television shows based on American novels
Television series set in the 1960s
Cultural depictions of scientists